Berhala island is island of Sumatra in Indonesia about 0.36 km2.

It is located in the Malacca Strait between Medan and Perak., and is one of the 92 officially listed outlying islands of Indonesia.

Notes

Islands of Sumatra